Loh Rui En (born 29 January 1981), better known by her stage name Rui En (瑞恩), is a Singaporean actress and was named as one of the Seven Princesses of Mediacorp in 2006. She was under contract of MediaCorp.

Early life
Rui En was born on 29 January 1981 to a family consisting of her father, a property agent, and mother, a housewife. Her parents divorced when she was 17, and subsequently remarried to other persons when she in her 20s. While growing up, she shared in a 2008 The Straits Times interview, she used to smoke and drink socially to cope with the insecurity and instability she felt from her broken home, and after quitting ballet as a co-curricular activity (CCA) in secondary school. She subsequently kicked the habit in 2004.

Rui En studied at Singapore Chinese Girls' School for both her primary and secondary education, and subsequently at Raffles Junior College (RJC). She graduated from Nanyang Technological University with a Bachelor of Business in 2004.

Career

Modelling and music career
Rui En first started modelling after she completed her A Levels in RJC in 1999, and was managed by Phantom Management. In 2001, she was featured in a SingTel ad which propelled her into the limelight and earned her a feature in Singapore's edition of FHM. She subsequently signed on with Hype Records's subsidiary, Artistes Network.

Rui En ventured into Taiwan in 2002 with the stage name 芮恩. She made her first appearance as the female lead in label mate Jay Chou's music video for Secret Code (暗號) and went on to co-endorse Panasonic GD68 with him. Rui En subsequently released her debut regional Chinese album, Rui Σn vol. 01, in the same year under the co-production of Hype Records and Alfa Music. Chou composed the song White Feather (白色羽毛) which was released in her debut album, Rui Σn vol. 01.

Rui En was nominated as the Best Local Singer in the Singapore Hits Awards 2003 and was selected alongside Taufik Batisah to perform both the English and Mandarin versions of the 2005 National Day Parade's theme song, Reach Out for the Skies.

After a six years' break, Rui En released her second Chinese album in late 2008 under Hype Records, titled United Nations. This album was only released in Singapore, with all lyrics penned by Rui En herself. Since then, she resumed the use of her original name, 瑞恩. In April 2009, Rui En was invited to perform at Singapore Day 2009 at London's Hampton Court Palace, a yearly event organised by the Overseas Singaporean Unit in the Prime Minister's Office to engage overseas Singaporeans.

Acting career
Rui En made her acting debut in MediaCorp drama, No Problem, in 2002. She landed her first leading role in 2005, with A Promise for Tomorrow. In the following year, she was identified as one of the most promising young actresses in the Singapore Entertainment Industry by local entertainment magazine I-Weekly and was hence labelled as one of the Seven Princesses of Mediacorp.

In 2004, Rui En took over Steph Song's role in the English sitcom Achar! for the second season after Song left the series after falling out with the male lead, Jas Arora. However, after reviewing her performance in that sitcom, Rui En felt that she was acting just for fame and popularity as a clutch to her broken family situation. Thereafter, in addition to quitting smoking and drinking, she decided to stop taking up roles that require kissing and/or intimate scenes. Thus despite being nominated for the Best Newcomer Award in 2004's Star Awards, she was limited in the choice of roles she could take on.

In March 2008, Rui En was involved in a high-profile rejection of the role as an ambitious businesswoman struggling with mental illness in The Defining Moment, which subsequently went to Fann Wong instead. She was reported to have rejected the role due to a rape scene in the script as part of her stance against revealing, kissing or intimate scenes and has been criticised by some as unprofessional. She is reported to have been blacklisted by some producers after this role-rejection incident. After playing a social service worker and AIDS patient in By My Side in 2008, Rui En started to gain recognition, winning one of the eight 'Top 8 Likable Female Lead Characters' awards with her only production that year. 

In 2010, Rui En was labelled as one of the 10 Faces to watch in 2010 by MediaCorp's Buzz. Rui En also won several awards for the characters she portrayed, for instance her role as Zhang Luoyun in My School Daze which emerged as the 'Top 10 Favourite Female Characters' in Star Awards 2010, and Lin Jiaqi in The Dream Catchers which emerged as the 'Top 5 Favourite Female Characters'. 

In 2011, Rui En won the 'Most Favourite Female Character' award with her role as Yang Xiaodong in Happy Family.  Rui En was also credited for her outstanding performance in portraying a widow in With You, winning the 'Best Actress' award in Star Awards 2011.

Rui En was awarded the 'Best Actress in Leading Role' at the 2012 Asian Television Awards, for her role as a tough cop in crime drama Unriddle 2. She went on to win her third acting award in the following year at the Star Awards 2013 for the same role in Unriddle 2, earning her second 'Best Actress Award' at Star Awards. In 2013, Rui En was appointed the spokesperson for L'Oréal Paris Youth Code, making her the first Singaporean spokesperson for the international cosmetics brand.

In addition to her roles in dramas, Rui En has starred in a three-part docudrama produced by Channel NewsAsia, as one of Singapore's pioneer painters, Georgette Chen. The English-language series, which was also adapted into Mandarin, aired on Channel NewsAsia, MediaCorp Channel 5 and MediaCorp Channel 8 in April 2015.

Rui En received the All-Time Favourite Artiste award in the 2016 star awards after winning the Top 10 Most Popular Male Artistes award from 2005 to 2016 respectively with Qi Yuwu.

In 2021, Rui En left Artistes Network.

Personal life
In January 2016, Rui En was also involved in a hit and run accident. There were no casualties involved, and both parties agreed to make a private settlement.

On 13 April 2016, Rui En was involved in a car accident entering a carpark near her home when her car knocked over a stationary motorcycle. On 14 April, it was reported that Rui En was assisting the police with investigations into the accident. She subsequently apologised and responded with an official statement regarding the accident. The owner of the motorcycle accepted Rui En's apology through Wanbao on 15 April. For this incident, Rui En was fined S$700.

Community work
Rui En is the theme song singer for The Community Chest of Singapore. The song, titled "Listen to Your Heart", has been released in the form of EP in years 2003 and 2009.

She is also a regular volunteer at "Beyond Social Services". She has also volunteered for several children welfare organizations. Notably, in 2016, she volunteered her services together with her fan club to commemorate their 9th anniversary.

Discography

Solo albums
Rui Σn vol. 01 芮恩Rui Σn同名專輯 (December 2002)
United Nations 共和國 (October 2008)

Compilations
Morning Express VI 阳光系列6  (2003)
This compilation album consists of Rui En's The Way To Be Happy 快乐方式 (Track 3) and Test 考验 (Track 9). The songs were released under Rui En's birth name – 卢瑞恩 (Lú Ruì'ēn).

Celebrating 25 Years of Chinese Drama Collector's Edition 戏剧情牵25 (2007)
This album is a Collector's Edition composed of memorable theme songs spanning across the Singapore Chinese Drama's Twenty-Five years' History. Tracks from Rui En include a remix version of "The Way To Be Happy 快乐方式" and "Unfreeze 解冻". The songs were released under Rui En's stage name – 芮恩 (Ruì'ēn).

Singles
"Listen to Your Heart"
This is the theme song for The Community Chest of Singapore and there are English and Mandarin versions to this song. The songs were released in the form of a Single.
"Reach Out for the Skies (2005)"
This is the theme song for National Day Parade, 2005 and there are English and Mandarin versions to this song. Music videos were produced for both versions.
"Listen to Your Heart – Remix (2009)"
A remix version of the theme song for The Community Chest of Singapore, the Mandarin track was first performed on televised charity show, TrueHearts Show 2009. The EP released in November 2009 consisted of the original tracks and the remixes in both English and Mandarin. This graphic artwork for this single was designed by Rui En's fan club, RBKD, on behalf of The Community Chest of Singapore.

"Sky's the Limit"
 A single by Taufik Batisah featuring Rui En.
"Numb" 麻木 (2013)
 A single by Rui En.

Drama theme songs
Beautiful Connection – "The Way To Be Happy 快乐方式 "(2002)
This song was nominated as Best Drama Theme Song in Star Awards 2002 and was first released in Morning Express VI. A remix version was released in Celebrating 25 Years of Chinese Drama Collector's Edition.
No Problem! – "Test 考验" (2003)
This is an insert song released in Morning Express VI.
Love at 0 °C – "Unfreeze 解冻" (2006)
This was Rui En's first set of self-penned lyrics published and also her first and only theme song for the drama she is starring in. This song is released in Celebrating 25 Years of Chinese Drama Collecter's Edition.
By My Side – "Slow Dance 慢舞" (2008)
This is an insert song found in Rui En's United Nations.

Singles

Filmography

Film

Television

Variety Show

Awards and nominations

Others
In 2007, Rui En was presented with the "Nanyang Outstanding Young People Award" by her alma mater Nanyang Technological University.

References

1981 births
Living people
Singaporean people of Cantonese descent
Nanyang Technological University alumni
Raffles Junior College alumni
21st-century Singaporean women singers
Singaporean Mandopop singers
Singaporean television personalities
Singaporean Christians
Singaporean television actresses